The Best American Poetry 2000, a volume in The Best American Poetry series, was edited by David Lehman and by guest editor Rita Dove.

In her introduction, Dove defended the idea that poets should be politically committed: "[W]e poets cannot afford to shit ourselves away in our convalescent homes, boning our specialized fools, while the barbarians — no matter if they are religious fanatics, materialistic profitmongers, crazy silver-tongued niggas sleeping in libraries, or merely more talented MFA drop-outs who actually care about 'art' — continue to sharpen their broadswords. Stepping into the fray of life does not mean dissipation of one's creative powers [...] The reward is a connection on a visceral level with the world [...]."

Speaking of her selection process, Dove indicated that once potential selections had been identified, either via her own reading or as submitted to her by the series editor, David Lehman, "[m]y method was simple: Read the poems without looking at the author's name, if possible, and put aside for further consideration only those pieces which made me catch my breath (then, look back at the names and decide from there). The final criterion was Emily Dickinson's famed description--if I felt the top of my head had been taken off, the poem was in. And in the lofty words of Billy Collins, 'This music is loud yet so confidential./ I cannot help feeling even more/ like the center of the universe'."

Michael Shannon Friedman, reviewing the book in The Charleston Gazette, noted that Dove had admitted the "subjectivity" of her selections, and observed that, in his own view, the year's best selections were poems by Barbara Hamby, Thomas Lux, Stanly Plumly, Susan Wood and Mary Oliver.

Poets and poems included

Best American poems of the twentieth century
For this book in the series, Lehman, the general editor "invited his 14 past and present guest editors to list their choices for 15 best poems of the century. Most did, but Adrienne Rich refused flat out, and Louise Glück wrote a thoughtful letter, also declining. It said, in part: 'There can't be, I think, the best of the great ... What remains is preference.'"

From the responses Lehman got, he drew up a composite list of 32 poets whose work was nominated by at least two guest editors. In alphabetical order:

 
A. R. Ammons 
W. H. Auden 
John Ashbery 
John Berryman 
Elizabeth Bishop 
Gwendolyn Brooks 
Hart Crane 
Robert Creeley 

T. S. Eliot 
Robert Frost 
Robert Hayden 
Langston Hughes 
Randall Jarrell 
Kenneth Koch 
Robert Lowell 
James Merrill 

Marianne Moore 
Frank O'Hara 
Sylvia Plath 
Ezra Pound 
Kenneth Rexroth 
Edwin Arlington Robinson 
Theodore Roethke 
James Schuyler 

Delmore Schwartz 
William Stafford 
Gertrude Stein 
Wallace Stevens 
Robert Penn Warren 
Richard Wilbur 
William Carlos Williams 
James Wright

See also
 2000 in poetry

Notes

External links
 Web page for contents of the book, with links to each publication where the poems originally appeared

Best American Poetry series
2000 poetry books
American poetry anthologies